Janaki is a rural municipality in Kailali District located in Sudurpashchim Province of Nepal.

The rural municipality was established In 2017 while the Nepalese government restructured 753 new local level units cancelling the old thousands of local level units. The rural municipality was created merging the then four following VDCs: Janakinagar, Pathraiya, Durgauli, and Munuwa.

References

Populated places in Kailali District
Rural municipalities of Nepal established in 2017